Michael Breitbach is an American politician who served as a member of the Iowa Senate for the 28th district from 2013 to 2021. Breitbach was born in Manchester, Iowa and he resides in Strawberry Point, Iowa.

Breitbach served on the following committees in the Iowa Senate: Commerce, Natural Resources and Environment, and Transportation. He also serves on the Commission on Tobacco Use Prevention and Control, and on the following interim study committees: Cannabidiol Implementation Study Committee, and Emergency Medical Services Study Committee.

Electoral history

References

External links 
Official campaign site
Official legislator site

Democratic Party Iowa state senators
1956 births
Living people
People from Clayton County, Iowa
People from Manchester, Iowa
Loras College alumni
21st-century American politicians